Natalia Gajl (December 23, 1921 in Poznań – April 6, 1998)  was a Polish lawyer and economist, professor in law and judge of the Constitutional Tribunal in 1985–1989.

She was the head of the Department of Financial Law of the University of Lodz from 1964, Deputy Dean of the faculty in 1969–1972, and Dean in 1972–1981. She was the first female docent of financial law in Polish higher education.

References

1921 births
1998 deaths
Lawyers from Łódź
Polish women lawyers
20th-century Polish judges
Lawyers from Poznan
20th-century women lawyers
Academic staff of the University of Łódź